Marcela Chibás Maleta (born 31 December 1951) is a Cuban sprinter. She competed in the women's 4 × 400 metres relay at the 1972 Summer Olympics.

References

1951 births
Living people
Athletes (track and field) at the 1972 Summer Olympics
Cuban female sprinters
Olympic athletes of Cuba
Sportspeople from Guantánamo
Pan American Games medalists in athletics (track and field)
Pan American Games silver medalists for Cuba
Athletes (track and field) at the 1971 Pan American Games
Medalists at the 1971 Pan American Games
Olympic female sprinters
20th-century Cuban women
20th-century Cuban people